Pashenkovo is a rural locality (a khutor) in Borshchyovskoye Rural Settlement, Khokholsky District, Voronezh Oblast, Russia. The population was 52 as of 2010.

Geography 
Pashenkovo is located 58 km southeast of Khokholsky (the district's administrative centre) by road. Arkhangelskoye is the nearest rural locality.

References 

Rural localities in Khokholsky District